Avunculicide is the act of killing an uncle. The word can also refer to someone who commits such an act. The term is derived from the Latin words avunculus meaning "maternal uncle" and caedere meaning "to cut down" or "to kill". Edmunds suggests that in mythology avunculicide is a substitute for parricide. The killing of a nephew is a nepoticide.

In history
 The mythological founders of Rome, Romulus and Remus, accidentally killed their grand-uncle, Amulius.
 Caligula was suspected of assisting with the murder of his great-uncle Tiberius, whom he succeeded as emperor.
 Claudius was apparently poisoned by his niece Agrippina the Younger, so her son Nero could succeed.
 In 51, Rhadamistus killed his uncle Mithridates of Armenia.
 In 685, Hlothhere of Kent succumbed to his wounds after his nephew Eadric of Kent led the South-Saxons to take his throne.
 In 1113, Dharanindravarman I was killed in battle by his great-nephew Suryavarman II, so he could become king of the Khmer Empire. 
 In 1385, Bernabò Visconti died after his nephew Gian Galeazzo Visconti had him imprisoned and presumably poisoned.
 In 1845, Prime Minister Mathabarsingh Thapa of Nepal was assassinated by his nephew, Jung Bahadur Kunwar
 In 1975, King Faisal of Saudi Arabia was assassinated by his nephew, Faisal bin Musa'id.
 In 1979, President Francisco Macías Nguema of Equatorial Guinea was executed after a coup d'état by his nephew Teodoro Obiang Nguema Mbasogo
 In 2001, Crown Prince Dipendra of Nepal killed his uncle Dhirendra during the Nepalese royal massacre.
 In 2013, North Korean leader Kim Jong-un ordered the execution of his (political) uncle, Jang Song-thaek.

In fiction

In gaming
 Agent 47 kills three of his genetic uncles throughout the events of Codename 47, Silent Assassin, and Contracts.
 In God of War III (2010), Kratos brutally murders his uncle Poseidon by gouging out his eyes and breaks his neck. He later implements equally brutal and different methods to kill his uncle Hades. He also tore Helios’ head off his shoulders with his bare hands.
 In Grand Theft Auto: Chinatown Wars, Huang avenges his father's death by killing his Uncle Kenny Lee because Lee killed Hunag's father and tries to kill Huang.
 In the video game The Darkness, Jackie Estacado, the game's protagonist, kills his "uncle" Paulie in revenge over the death of his girlfriend Jenny Romano, which Paulie himself was responsible for.
 In Death Stranding, is told in an archive that the antagonist Higgs Monaghan grew up with his abusive uncle. Higgs ended up killing him in self-defence with a knife.

In literature
 Hamlet kills his uncle, King Claudius to avenge his father King Hamlet, whom Claudius murdered to seize the throne of Denmark.
 In Vladimir Nabokov's 1928 novel King, Queen, Knave, Franz intends to murder his uncle. In the novel's 1968 English translation (with changes made by the author), the narrator tells us that later on he will be "guilty of worse sins than avunculicide".
 In the Hellsing (1997–2008) manga series, Integra kills her uncle, who wanted the Hellsing organization for his own selfish purposes, in self-defense after unintentionally reviving the vampire Alucard with blood from a gunshot wound.
 In the prequel to A Song of Ice and Fire, The Princess and the Queen, Prince Aemond Targaryen and his uncle Prince Daemon Targaryen kill each other in battle atop dragons, Daemon killing Aemond moments before their dragons fall into a lake.
 In Geoffrey of Monmouth's History of the Kings of Britain, Constantine III of Britain is mentioned to have been murdered by his nephew Aurelius Conanus, who then seized the throne.

Onscreen
 Louis Mazzini commits avunculicide in the 1949 movie, Kind Hearts and Coronets.
 In the 1966 horror movie, Let's Kill Uncle, the evil uncle is to be killed in self-defense.
 Mass murderer Jason Voorhees is actually stabbed by his previously unmentioned niece Jessica Kimble with a special knife before being dragged to hell in the last official film of the Friday the 13th franchise Jason Goes to Hell: The Final Friday.
 In The Lion King, Simba causes his uncle Scar's death by tossing him from the top of the rock, and the hyenas maul him to death.
 In The Sopranos, Tony Soprano attempts to organize the murder of his paternal uncle, Corrado Soprano, after he and Tony's mother, Livia Soprano had conspired to have Tony "whacked" after a power struggle. The attempt fails, and the incident is revisited throughout the series.
 In Star Wars: The Last Jedi, the physical stress required to project his image across the galaxy during his fight with his nephew Kylo Ren caused Luke Skywalker to die. 
 In season 1 of Ozark, Ruth Langmore kills her two uncles, Russ and Boyd. This leads her father, Cade, to ask in season 2: "...what the fuck is the word for a girl killing her uncles?"
 During Gotham, Jerome Valeska breaks out of prison and kills his uncle Zachary by shooting him in revenge for his uncle's abuse. Previously Zachary tried to kill Jerome.
 In Young Justice, Geo-Force defeats his uncle Baron Bedlam for kidnapping his sister, orchestrating his parents' murder, and betrayed the crown. After his teammates stop him, he nearly rescinds his choice but ultimately kills his uncle after the latter escapes and goads him to kill him, which he does by making him choke on hot lava.

See also
 Avunculism
 Suicide, the killing of oneself

Familial killing terms
 Filicide, the killing of one's child
 Fratricide, the killing of one's brother
 Mariticide, the killing of one's husband
 Matricide, the killing of one's mother
 Parricide, the killing of one's parents or another close relative
 Patricide, the killing of one's father
 Prolicide, the killing of one's offspring
 Sororicide, the killing of one's sister
 Uxoricide, the killing of one's wife

Non-familial killing terms from the same root
 Deicide, the killing of a god
 Genocide, the systematic killing of a large group of people, usually an entire ethnic, racial, religious or national group
 Homicide, the killing of a human
 Infanticide, the killing of an infant from birth to 12 months
 Regicide, the killing of a monarch (king or ruler)
 Tyrannicide, the killing of a tyrant
 Feminicide, the gender-based killing of a woman
 Androcide, the gender-based killing of a man

References

Killings by type
Familicides
Homicide